The skeletal muscle pump or musculovenous pump is a collection of skeletal muscles that aid the heart in the circulation of blood. It is especially important in increasing venous return to the heart, but may also play a role in arterial blood flow.

General
The skeletal muscle pump is vital in negating orthostatic intolerance when standing. When moving upright, the blood volume moves to the peripheral parts of the body. To combat this, the muscles involved in standing contract and help to bring venous blood volume to the heart. The pump is important in affecting the central and local supply of blood output. Venous return, cardiac output, and stroke volume were all increased during exercise experiments, as well as affecting the local muscle being used, blood volume.

Arterial blood pumping
Between muscle relaxations, intramuscular pressure transiently returns to a level below the venous blood pressure. This allows blood from the capillary system to refill the veins until the next contraction. It is postulated that this change in pressure may be great enough to draw blood from the arterial side to the venous side. It is hypothesized that this pressure drop during rhythmic contraction actually increases blood flow through the muscle, and may be responsible for a portion of the increase in muscle blood flow immediately at the onset of activity. This explanation is attractive, because it would explain the readily observable tight coupling between muscle contraction and a rapid increase in muscle blood flow. However, recent evidence has emerged that cast doubts on this theory. Experiments have shown that a strong muscle contraction can occur without a corresponding increase in skeletal muscle blood flow. Given the proposed manner of action of the muscle pump to increase arterial blood flow, it would seem impossible for a muscle contraction and skeletal muscle hyperemia to be uncoupled. Another experiment recently was only able to find evidence that vasodilation, not the skeletal muscle pump, was responsible for maintaining proper pressure and blood return. This might have to do with the lack of rigorous physiological tests thus far used to be able to prove the pump.

Experiments have shown the use of passive leg exercises, where only vasodilation was used, was responsible for increased blood return.

See also
Tilt table test

References

External links
 Medical College of Georgia article on the Skeletal-muscle pump

Muscular system
Veins